Help for Heroes (H4H) is a British charity which provides lifelong recovery support to British Armed Forces service personnel who have been wounded or injured in the line of duty, and to their families, originally only since 11 September 2001, though this restriction was subsequently removed.  The charity has supported more than 25,000 individuals since 2007, through its physical, psychological, financial, sports, fellowship, and welfare support services.  It was founded in 2007 by Bryn Parry and his wife Emma, after they visited soldiers at Selly Oak Hospital in Birmingham.

H4H has attracted high-profile trustees and patrons, and has the support of the Ministry of Defence.  It has also attracted support from national newspapers in the United Kingdom, such as The Sun and The Sunday Times who made H4H one of the beneficiaries of their Christmas appeal in 2007, raising £674,000 for the charity.

History
Help for Heroes was co-founded by Bryn Parry and his wife Emma Parry, and launched in October 2007 after a meeting with General Sir Richard Dannatt, Chief of the General Staff, the then professional head of the British Army.  Bryn had served with the Royal Green Jackets for ten years, before leaving to become a cartoonist.  The couple visited Selly Oak Hospital, where they met injured servicemen and women, in July 2007, and decided they needed to do something to help.  Bryn and Emma Parry were both invested with the OBE in the 2010 Queen's Birthday Honours for their services to charity on 25 November 2010.

In May 2013, Help for Heroes hit the headlines when British soldier Lee Rigby was murdered in Woolwich, London.  Rigby had been wearing a Help for Heroes hooded sweatshirt when he was horrifically killed by repeated machete wounds from an Islamic fundamentalist, and the charity received over £600,000 in donations in the week following the attack.

In November 2016, Melanie Waters, former chief executive of The Poppy Factory, became the chief executive of the charity when Bryn Parry stood down after nine years in charge.

The combined effect of both a 33% rise in demand and a sharp fall in donations lead to 145 jobs (80% of the staff), 130 of which were on Covid-19 furlough leave, were nearly lost on 17/09/2020 

Help For Heroes had helped the Royal British Legion in the training, selection and development of the UK team in the Invictus Games. The UK's Ministry of Defence cut Help For Heroes’ ties to the Invictus Games for unknown reasons in May 2022, and gave sole responsibility for the UK team to the Royal British Legion.

Recovery centres

In partnership with the Ministry of Defence (MoD) and The Royal British Legion (RBL), Help for Heroes runs four recovery centres: Tedworth House (Tidworth, Wiltshire), Chavasse VC House (Colchester, Essex), Naval Service Recovery Centre (Plymouth, Devon), and Phoenix House (Catterick, North Yorkshire).  Each centre is a location for the Defence Recovery Capability programme.  Participants in the programme receive coordinated medical, psychological, and welfare support, designed to help them overcome sickness and injury, and ultimately return to active duty, or transition to civilian life.

In September 2020, due to the financial strain of the COVID-19 pandemic, Help for Heroes announced that it was closing three of its recovery centres for the foreseeable future (Catterick, Plymouth and Colchester), and would instead be focusing on digital and community recovery delivery.

Recovery support

Help for Heroes delivers its one-to-one recovery support as follows:
Psychological support – the Hidden Wounds team offers cognitive behavioural therapy and guided self-help to veterans and their families living with depression, anxiety, stress, or anger, and those who wish to change their drinking habits.
Welfare Support – the welfare team offers advice and guidance on a range of issues, such as money, health, housing, and benefits.
Veterans Clinical Liaison Team – the team works with men and women with physical health challenges, helping them to re-engage with the community.
Very Seriously Injured Programme – the programme supports men and women living with catastrophic injuries who need round-the-clock care; the charity helps them gain access to support such as speech and language therapy, financial assistance with carer costs, and specialist equipment.
Grants – grants can be awarded to those in need of urgent financial support for their recovery.

In September 2020, the charity launched its virtual Recovery College, the first of its kind specially designed for and by wounded veterans and their families.  All educational modules are designed to enable veterans to take ownership of their recovery.

Many veterans and their families experience social isolation.  The charity set up its Band of Brothers (veterans) and Band of Sisters (loved ones) fellowship programme to tackle this.

Sports recovery programme
Help for Heroes has been involved with sports recovery since 2008, giving the charity's beneficiaries access to over 50 sports every year, and enabling wounded, injured, and sick service personnel, and veterans to take part in adaptive sports; from grass-roots through to performance level.

Help for Heroes works in partnership with the British Paralympic Association (BPA), UK Sport, the English Institute of Sport, and relevant national governing bodies, to introduce military personnel and veterans to Paralympic sport.

Invictus Games
Help for Heroes was responsible for the training, selection, and development of Team UK the first four editions of the Invictus Games: 2014 (London), 2016 (Orlando, Florida, USA), 2017 (Toronto, Ontario, Canada), and 2018 (Sydney). Help for Heroes worked in partnership with the Ministry of Defence and the Royal British Legion to support the UK team. The charity was to deliver and train the 65-strong team at the 2020 Invictus Games in the Hague, which was postponed to 2022 due to the COVID-19 pandemic. In May 2022, it was announced that the Ministry of Defence had put an end (before the 2022 edition) to Help for Heroes' association with the Invictus Games, leaving the Royal British Legion as the only entity responsible for supporting the UK team.

Grants
Help for Heroes previously grant funded more than 60 specialist charities; including The Prince's Trust, The Poppy Factory, and Combat Stress. The charity now focuses its financial support in the form of individual grants to wounded personnel, veterans and families.  In 2019, the charity awarded 819 such grants, totalling £703,000, and taking the life-to-date awards total to 12,969.

The oldest beneficiary of the charity is Robbie Clarke, who was 96 when he received an emergency grant in 2015, to ensure he could remain living at home.

Finances

Only 3.4 per cent of Help for Heroes' income is Government funded; the rest comes from supporters and public fundraising.

In 2018, Help for Heroes raised more than £22 million, and in 2019, the charity stated that for the third year in a row, outgoings (£32.5 million) exceeded income (£26.9 million).

In September 2020, the charity announced that its income was falling due to the COVID-19 pandemic, and was half of what it was 10 years previously.

97% of its 2020 fundraising was from public donations.

Events and challenges
H4H offers challenges including bike rides in Europe; the Big Battlefield Bike Ride in May 2008 was the inaugural H4H challenge: where 300 cyclists biked from HMS Victory at Portsmouth.  After a ferry crossing of the English Channel, the group then cycled through Northern France, tracing some of the region's most significant First World War and Second World War battle sites, and returned to London; the event raised £1 million.  There have been eleven further bike rides, and they are considered one of the charity's main challenges.  Supporters also take part in a wide variety of other challenges, such as treks through Nepal and the Sahara Desert, Skydives, various marathons from London to Barcelona, the chance to climb Kilimanjaro, and two one-day challenges; a New Forest bike ride, and a 26-mile walk from Avebury to Stonehenge.

Supporters' events

On 5 September 2008, H4H held a Heroes Ball to raise funds.  A charity auction included a Royal Air Force (RAF) donated prize to fly with the Red Arrows, the RAF's aerobatics team.  The winning bid was £1.5 million which gave the winner, Julie Heselden, the chance for her and eight family members to fly in the team's Hawk jets.  The RAF said of the bid, "We know it is a special prize – a once in a lifetime opportunity – but we are all astounded that someone could be so generous.  The RAF is genuinely delighted to have helped in raising such a fantastic amount of money for such a worthwhile charity."

City Salute
The charity was a joint beneficiary of the 'City Salute' held on 8 May 2008 in London, hosted by patron of the charity Jeremy Clarkson, and attended by Princes William and Harry, who were both members of the British Armed Forces.

Sporting challenges
On 20 September 2008, Twickenham Stadium hosted a rugby union challenge match, featuring rugby players from around the world which raised £1.1 million, and was televised live.  The match featured a Help for Heroes XV and an International Select XV.  Former England captains Phil de Glanville and Lawrence Dallaglio acted as team manager and captain respectively for the H4H XV, with Welsh rugby players Ieuan Evans and Scott Gibbs filling the same roles for the International Select XV.  The teams included players from the Guinness Premiership, National Division One, the Celtic League, overseas players, and players from the armed forces.  The Help for Heroes XV won the match 29–10 in front of a crowd of 52,254, which included The Prince of Wales and The Duchess of Cornwall.  Performing at the event were the Band of the Royal Hospital School, Blake, Escala, and the Royal Marines Commandos abseil team.

A second rugby match, 'The Heroes Rugby Challenge' was played on 3 December 2011 at Twickenham Stadium.  The match featured Lawrence Dallaglio, Jason Leonard, and Ieuan Evans managing the H4H Northern Hemisphere XV against a Southern Hemisphere team, coached by Wayne Smith and Nick Mallett and overseen by Michael Lynagh and Sean Fitzpatrick.

On 12 November 2009, a football match was held at the Madejski Stadium in Reading, Berkshire, between an England XI team and a Rest of the World XI team, playing for the Heroes Cup.  The teams comprised ex-professional footballers, other sportspersons and celebrities, and footballing members of the armed forces.  The match was broadcast live on ITV4 and British Forces Broadcasting Service (BFBS), and was commentated on by Peter Drury and Joe Royle.  The Rest of the World beat England 4–1.

The X Factor charity single
In October 2010, it was announced that the finalists of the seventh series of The X Factor would be recording a version of David Bowie's 1977 song Heroes.  The song was released in aid of H4H and the Royal British Legion.  All sixteen finalists of Series 7 performed the song on 20 November 2010's results show.  In the first week of its release, it went straight to number 1, and sold 313,244 copies, more than the rest of the top ten at the time combined.

British Chancellor of the Exchequer Alistair Darling announced he would effectively waive VAT on the single, by donating the value of the VAT paid on the single to the charity.  He said "I very much support the Help for Heroes campaign and I support too the efforts being made by the X Factor contestants, and in recognition of that I am proposing effectively to waive VAT on this sale of these singles."

Help for Heroes Concert 2010
This was held on 12 September 2010 at Twickenham Stadium in London, and featured, among others, Robbie Williams, Gary Barlow, Peter Kay, Tom Jones, and Pixie Lott.  The concert was shown live on BBC One, and was presented by Cat Deeley.

Convoy for Heroes
At Easter 2011, the first Convoy for Heroes event took place at Gaydon in Warwickshire, to raise money for Help for Heroes.  Organised by Land Rover enthusiasts, Convoy for Heroes took the form of a world-record breaking convoy of 348 Land Rovers, including SAS 'Pink Panther' Land Rovers, and several SAS troops themselves.  A second Convoy for Heroes event was held over Easter 2012, this time at the larger Prestwold Hall site in Leicestershire.  So far, over £25,000 has been raised by Convoy for Heroes.

4x4 European Rally
The Help for Heroes 4x4 European Rally is an annual non-speed battlefield touring assembly that takes place in June.  The event has raised over £1 million for the charity.  Starting in England, it covers 2,000 miles and seven countries in twelve days, visiting World War I and II battlefields and museums.  It is open to 45 teams of road-legal off-road-capable vehicles, with at least two drivers per team.

Trustees
The Help for Heroes Board of Trustees, who work in an unpaid, voluntary capacity, are responsible for the overall control and strategic direction of the charity. The chair of the trustees is Nigel Boardman, a former partner at corporate law firm Slaughter and May.

Ambassadors and patrons
The charity's ambassadors include:
Johnson Beharry – a soldier of the 1st Battalion, Princess of Wales's Royal Regiment who was awarded the Victoria Cross (VC), the highest military decoration for valour in the British and Commonwealth armed forces, for twice saving members of his unit from ambushes on 1 May and 11 June 2004 at Al-Amarah, Iraq; he sustained serious head injuries in the latter engagement.
Major Peter Norton – an officer with the Royal Logistic Corps who was awarded the George Cross (GC) for his service in Iraq.
Patrons include:
General The Lord Dannatt – former professional head of the British Army
Ross Kemp – BAFTA award-winning actor, and journalist, who rose to prominence in the role of Grant Mitchell in the BBC soap opera, EastEnders; has spent time with British troops in Afghanistan filming Ross Kemp in Afghanistan
Sgt Mark Sutcliffe – serving with the 2nd Battalion ('The Poachers'), The Royal Anglian Regiment; he lost his left leg in Basra in July 2006 after being hit by a rocket-propelled grenade
WO2 Andy Newell – serving in 16 Air Assault Brigade; in July 2006, his right arm was shattered in the bitter and prolonged fighting at Musa Qala in Helmand Province, Afghanistan
Andy Stockton – served with 32 Regiment Royal Artillery for nearly twenty years reaching the rank of Warrant Officer Class 2 (WO2); he served three tours of Northern Ireland, three tours in Iraq, and in Afghanistan. He lost his arm during an ambush by the Taliban in Sangin, Helmand Province, Afghanistan in June 2006, and was medically discharged from the Army in September 200
Andy McNab – former soldier in the Royal Green Jackets and then the SAS with whom he served in the Gulf War.  He commanded the Bravo Two Zero patrol in January 1991, which was given the task of destroying underground communication links in Iraq and mobile Scud launchers.  Three of the eight-man patrol were killed, one escaped, and four were taken prisoner by the Iraqis and tortured over a six-week period.  He has since written a number of books, and appeared in Andy McNab's Tour of Duty, a documentary television series about the War in Afghanistan, and the Iraq War in 2008.  He was the most highly decorated serving soldier in the British Army when he left the SAS in 1993.
Ken Hames – a former SAS officer who now works as a television presenter and motivational speaker

Awards
Help for Heroes was awarded the Support to the Armed Forces award during the 2008 Sun Military Awards – "For a civilian, a civil servant, a contractor, or just an ordinary member of the public, who has provided invaluable help to the Armed Forces".

Criticism

2012 Newsnight report
In August 2012, a group of wounded ex-servicemen, featured in a report for BBC's Newsnight, criticised Help for Heroes for its relationship to the Ministry of Defence (MoD). The criticism was levelled because of the charity's decision to use funds to subsidise expensive MoD buildings, rather than for soldiers' everyday care. The charity had agreed to spend £153 million on constructing and running five regional MoD Personnel Recovery Centres, primarily for serving military personnel, which discharged servicemen could only use on a case-by-case basis. A subsequent investigation by the BBC's Editorial Complaints Unit into the original Newsnight report upheld the charity's complaint about the programme, and concluded that "there was no evidence to back Newsnight's claim about Help for Heroes". The BBC issued an official apology over it on 16/05/2013., but the BBC journalist who complied the report stood by his findings and the source's legitimacy

Tedworth House recovery centre
It was reviled on 02\10\2016 that a Charity Commission earlier that year had found out that Help For Heroes had paid out £158,000 to settle employment claims over the past 4 years. It was launced ater the commicion had been told about bullying allegations at the Tedworth House recovery centre in Wiltshire.

References

External links

British veterans' organisations
Charities based in Wiltshire
Organizations established in 2007
2007 establishments in the United Kingdom
Disability organisations based in the United Kingdom